1982 with a Bullet was a 1982 various artists "hits" album released in Australia on EMI (Catalogue No. LP EMI GIVE 2005). The album spent 5 weeks as #1 on the Australian Album charts in 1982. In September 2009 the album was voted by listeners of Hobart radio station 7HO as the best compilation album of all time.

Track listing

Track Origins

"Why Do Fools Fall In Love" by Diana Ross was first recorded by US group Frankie Lymon & The Teenagers in 1956.
"The Lion Sleeps Tonight" by Tight Fit was originally made famous by US group The Tokens in 1961.
"Let's Hang On" by Barry Manilow was originally made famous by US group The Four Seasons in 1965.
"Mickey" by Toni Basil was first recorded by UK pop group Racey in 1979 (aka "Kitty").
"Body and Soul" by Jo Kennedy was originally from the 1982 Australian film, Starstruck and was originally recorded by Split Enz as “She Got Body She Got Soul” in 1979.

Charts

References

1982 compilation albums
EMI Records compilation albums
Pop compilation albums